WASP-10 is a star in the constellation Pegasus. The SuperWASP project has observed and classified this star as a variable star, perhaps due to the eclipsing planet.

The star is likely older than Sun, has fraction of heavy elements close to solar abundance, and is rotating rapidly, being spun up by the tides raised by the giant planet on the close orbit.

Planetary system

WASP-10b is an extrasolar planet discovered in 2008.

WASP-10c is an unconfirmed as in 2020 extrasolar planet inferred from transit time variations of WASP-10b's transits. It was discovered in 2010.

High likelihood of another Super-Jupiter planet at wide (at least 5 astronomical units) orbit was reported in 2013.

See also
 SuperWASP
 WASP-10b
 List of extrasolar planets

References

External links
 

Pegasus (constellation)
K-type main-sequence stars
Planetary transit variables
Planetary systems with one confirmed planet
J23155829+3127462
10